The Deccani film industry, also known as Dollywood is the Deccani language/Hyderabadi Urdu film industry based in Hyderabad, Telangana, India. The films have gained popularity not only in the Deccan region of India, but as well as other Hindi/Urdu speaking areas of the world. The films are produced in the Deccani language, an Indo-Aryan Dravidian Hindustani tongue spoken in Southern India, and more specifically, in Hyderabadi Urdu, while some films incorporate standard Urdu dialogues as well, especially in its music. Originally labelled as "Hindi" films by the central board of film certification, the industry has now gotten its own language tag of Dakhini.

List of Deccani films

Bollywood movies of Deccani dialect
 Ankur (1974)

 Nishant (1975)
 Bazaar (1982)
 Nikaah (1982)
 Mandi (1983)
 Hero Hiralal (1988)
 Hyderabad Blues (1998)
 Meenaxi: A Tale of Three Cities (2004)
 Well Done Abba (2010)
 Daawat-e-Ishq (2014)
 Bobby Jasoos (2014)

References 

Cinema of Telangana
Culture of Hyderabad, India